The 1962–63 1re série season was the 42nd season of the 1re série, the top level of ice hockey in France. Eight teams participated in the first round, and Chamonix Hockey Club won their 19th league title.

First round

Paris

Alpes

Final round

External links
Season on hockeyarchives.info

Fra
1962–63 in French ice hockey
Ligue Magnus seasons